Big River Township is an inactive township in Jefferson County, in the U.S. state of Missouri.

Big River Township takes its name from Big River.

References

Townships in Missouri
Townships in Jefferson County, Missouri